Sebastiaan Bleekemolen (born 9 August 1978 in Haarlem) is a Dutch racing driver that currently competes in the NASCAR Whelen Euro Series, driving for the family-owned Team Bleekemolen in the No. 69 Ford Mustang in the EuroNASCAR PRO class. His brother Jeroen and father Michael are also racing drivers. His father is a former Formula One driver, who has competed with RAM and ATS. Sebastiaan won the Benelux and Dutch Formula Ford 1800 championships in 1996, but decided early in his career formula racing was not his thing and already started driving sports cars and touring cars from 1997.

Since 2002 he has been very successful in sports car racing and touring car racing. He became the Dutch Renault Clio Cup champion three times, winning the championship in 2002, 2004 and 2011. He won the Dutch Winter Endurance championship in 2003-04 and in 2009-10.

Since 2010 he participated in the American Le Mans Series. He has always driven a Porsche 911 GT3 Cup in the GTC class, but with three different teams. Since the merger of the American Le Mans Series and the Rolex Sports Car Series, which became the IMSA Tudor United SportsCar Championship, he drives a SRT Viper GT3-R with Riley Motorsports in the GTD class together with his brother and Ben Keating.

Racing record

Complete FIA GT Championship results
(key) (Results are overall/class)

Complete Porsche Supercup results
(key) (Races in italics indicate fastest lap)

 Did not finish, but was classified as he had completed more than 90% of the race distance.
 Not eligible for points.

Complete American Le Mans Series results
(key) (Races in bold indicate pole position) (Results are overall/class)

  Not eligible for points. Bleekemolen was the third driver of the car and third drivers were only able to score points in Sebring and Road Atlanta. At the 2013 Petit Le Mans Bleekemolen was the fourth driver and was not able to score points.

Complete Eurocup Clio results
(key) (Races in bold indicate pole position)

Complete United SportsCar Championship results
(key) (Results are overall/class)

 Did not complete sufficient laps in order to score points.

Complete NASCAR results

Whelen Euro Series – EuroNASCAR PRO

References

External links

1978 births
Living people
Dutch racing drivers
FIA GT Championship drivers
Formula Ford drivers
Sportspeople from Haarlem
24 Hours of Daytona drivers
American Le Mans Series drivers
Porsche Supercup drivers
ADAC GT Masters drivers
WeatherTech SportsCar Championship drivers
24 Hours of Spa drivers
NASCAR drivers
Britcar 24-hour drivers
24H Series drivers
Walter Lechner Racing drivers
Michelin Pilot Challenge drivers
Porsche Carrera Cup Germany drivers